During the late 1970s and early 1980s, several men's professional slow-pitch softball leagues were formed in the United States to build on the growth and talent in the booming men's amateur game during this period.  The American Professional Slo-Pitch League (APSPL) was the first such league, launching in an era of experimentation in professional sports leagues.  The APSPL was formed in 1977 by former World Football League executive Bill Byrne, who would go on to found the Women's Professional Basketball League.  Former New York Yankees star Whitey Ford was the first APSPL commissioner.  

In 1980, three teams, the Milwaukee Schlitz, the Fort Wayne Huggie Bears and Cleveland Stepien's Competitors, broke away to form the North American Softball League (NASL), under the leadership of Cleveland owner Ted Stepien, who owned 6 of the 8 teams in the league (only Fort Wayne and Milwaukee had non-Stepien ownership in the new league), while the APSPL continued with just 6 teams.  Former Major League Baseball players Mudcat Grant and Joe Pepitone served as PR officials for the new league; Pepitone would also play for Chicago Nationwide Advertising, having played previously for the Trenton Statesmen franchise in the APSPL. The owners of the APSPL Pittsburgh Hardhats unsuccessfully challenged Stepien in court in an attempt to prevent the new league from splitting the young professional sport.  The NASL only lasted the one season.  Also in 1980, Stepien made the news when he held a promotional event for the league in Cleveland in which he dropped softballs from the 52nd floor of Terminal Tower to be caught by outfielders from his Cleveland Competitors team.  The balls were estimated to be traveling at 144 mph by the time they reached the street, damaging cars and injuring several spectators.  One was caught by Cleveland outfielder Mike Zarefoss.

In 1981 the APSPL merged with NASL to create the United Professional Softball League (UPSL), but only the Milwaukee franchise came from the NASL to the new league as the other NASL teams folded.  The merged league competed for two seasons, before disbanding after the 1982 season, ending the pro era of men's softball.

Of note historically, the first sporting event to air on ESPN on September 7, 1979 was an APSPL championship game between the Milwaukee Schlitz and Kentucky Bourbons.

A number of prominent athletes from other sports came to the professional softball leagues.  Major League Baseball baseball veterans Jim Rivera, Curt Blefary, Johnny Callison and Milt Pappas managed teams.    Softball players included former National Football League stars Billy "White Shoes" Johnson and Bob Lurtsema, Rick Wilson from the NBA, and retired MLB players Ralph Garr, Norm Cash, Bruce Miller, Jim Price, Darrel Chaney, Jim Northrup, Gene Hiser, Mickey Stanley, Danny Napoleon, Dick McAuliffe, and Zoilo Versalles.  Few had much success in professional softball, playing part-time and promotional roles.  The notable exception was former New York Yankee and Chicago Cub Joe Pepitone who played for the Trenton Statesmen.  Pepitone  put up respectable numbers in 1978 (110-225, .489, 14 HRs, 61 RBIs) and 1979 (50-122, .410, 9 HRs, 30 RBIs). The Detroit Caesars would even offer $30,000 to the Statesmen to buy Pepitone's contract in 1978.  That offer was rejected.   After the New Jersey franchise disbanded in 1979, Pepitone went on to serve as the team President and played first-base for Chicago Nationwide Advertising in the North American Softball League (NASL) in their 1980 season.

The professional softball era showcased some of the all-time best in softball history with several pro era veterans represented in the American Softball Association Hall of Fame - Tex Collins (Detroit), Ron Ford (Detroit), Jim Galloway (New York, Trenton), Bill Gatti (Kentucky), Mike Gouin (Detroit), Dennis Graser (Milwaukee), Mike Nye (Detroit), Steve Loya (Cleveland), Mike Mancenko (Cleveland), Willie Simpson (Chicago), Bert Smith (Detroit), and manager Eddie Zolna (Chicago).  In addition, pro softball alumni Rick Weiterman (Milwaukee), Cal Carmen (Rochester, Detroit), Gary Vitto (Detroit), Chuck Drewicz (Detroit), Bill Gatti (Kentucky), Mike Mancenko (Cleveland), and Braxton Speller, Jr. (Detroit) are members of United States Slowpitch Softball Association (USSSA) Hall of Fame.

Year-by-year awards and leaders

Professional Softball All-Time Team
Team chosen by Robert Brown, former NASL league commissioner

Men's professional softball teams

Baltimore Monuments (1977)
Chicago Nationwide Advertising (1980)
Chicago Storm (1977-1978)
Cincinnati Rivermen (1980)
Cincinnati Suds (1977-1982)
Cleveland Jaybirds (1977-1978), Cleveland Stepien's Competitors (1979-1980), Cleveland Competitors (1982)
Columbus All-Americans (1977)
Detroit Auto Kings (1980)
Detroit Caesars (1977-1979)
Detroit Softball City (1982)
Fort Wayne Huggie Bears (1980)
Fort Wayne Scouts (1979)
Kentucky Bourbons (1977-1982)
Lexington Stallions (1980)
Lima Steele's (1982)
Milwaukee Copper Hearth (1977), Milwaukee Schlitz (1978-1982)
Minnesota Goofy's (1977), Minnesota Norsemen (1978-1979)
New England Pilgrims (1978-1981)
New Jersey Statesmen (1977), Trenton Statesmen (1978), Trenton Champales (1979) 
New York Clippers (1977)
Philadelphia Athletics (1978-1980), South Jersey Athletics (1981-1982)
Pittsburgh Champions (1980)
Pittsburgh Hardhats (1977-1982)
Rochester Zeniths (1978-1979), Rochester Express (1980-1982)
Syracuse Salts (1981)

(Note that teams are listed horizontally if the same franchise changed names)

See also
 National Pro Fastpitch, a women's professional softball league

References

External links 
APSPL on Fun While It Lasted
Softball History Data
 Softball History USA
 Detroit Caesars Online Home
 National Softball Hall of Fame

Softball in the United States
Softball competitions
Professional sports leagues in the United States
Softball organizations
Softball
Men's professional softball teams